PLCKESZ G286.6-31.3 is a galaxy cluster that is seen through the outer fringes of the Large Magellanic Cloud. It has 530 trillion times the Sun's mass, up to 100 galaxies, more than 700 star clusters, and hundreds to thousands of supergiant stars. It is invisible to the naked eye.

Notes and references 

Galaxy clusters
Virgo (constellation)